The 1988 Arab Cup Final was a football match that took place on 21 July 1988, at the Amman International Stadium in Amman, Jordan, to determine the winner of the 1988 Arab Cup. Iraq defeated Syria 4–3 on penalties after a draw 1–1 to win their fourth Arab Cup.

Road to the final

Match

Details

References

External links
1988 Arab Cup - rsssf.com

F
1988
Nations
Nations
Association football penalty shoot-outs
International association football competitions hosted by Jordan
Iraq national football team matches
Syria national football team matches
July 1988 sports events in Asia
20th century in Amman